Pieter Steyn (October 6, 1706 in Haarlem – November 5, 1772) was Grand Pensionary of Holland from June 18, 1749 to November 5, 1772.

He was the son of Johanna Patijn and Adriaan Steyn, burgomaster of Haarlem and studied Law in Leiden between 1724 and 1726. Both his marriages (of 1736 and 1740) were without issue. He was survived by his second wife, Cornelia Schellinger.

External links
 Annotated list of Grand Pensinaries (Dutch)

1706 births
1772 deaths
Grand Pensionaries
People from Haarlem